The Athletic Federation of Georgia (Georgian: საქართველოს მძლეოსნობის ეროვნული ფედერაცია) is the governing body for the sport of athletics in Georgia.

Affiliations 
International Association of Athletics Federations (IAAF)
European Athletic Association (EAA)
Georgian National Olympic Committee

National records 
The Georgian Federation maintains the Georgian records in athletics.

External links 
Official webpage 

Georgia
Athletics
National governing bodies for athletics